Payton Thorne (born June 26, 2001) is an American football quarterback for the Michigan State Spartans.

High school career
Thorne originally attended Metea Valley High School in Aurora, Illinois before transferring to Naperville Central High School in Naperville, Illinois. As a senior in 2018, he was named the Chicago Sun-Times and Naperville Sun Player of the Year after throwing for 3,113 yards and 40 touchdowns. Thorne originally committed to Western Michigan University to play college football but later switched to Michigan State University.

College career
Thorne was redshirted his first year at Michigan State in 2019. In 2020, he played in four games as a backup to Rocky Lombardi and made one start. In his first career start against Penn State he passed for 325 yards and three touchdowns. For the season, he completed 48 of 85 passes for 582 yards with three touchdowns and three interceptions. Thorne was named the Spartans starter to open the 2021 season.

In his first full year as a starter in 2021 Thorne threw for 3,240 yards, 27 TDs, 10 INTs, with a 77.7 QBR. Thorne has been named to the Maxwell Award watch list for the upcoming 2022 season.

Statistics

Personal life
Thorne is a Christian. Thorne's father, Jeff Thorne, was the offensive coordinator at Western Michigan in 2022.

References

External links
Michigan State Spartans bio

2001 births
Living people
Sportspeople from Naperville, Illinois
Players of American football from Illinois
American football quarterbacks
Michigan State Spartans football players